Stephen Harding House, also known as the Wright-Underhill House and Turbillon, is a historic home located at Mill Neck in Nassau County, New York. The house is believed to date to the 18th century settlement period, then substantially expanded and restyled in the Colonial Revival style in the late-19th and early-20th centuries. It is a two-story, five bay, frame dwelling with a side gable roof with three dormers.  It has two two-story additions.  Also on the property are the contributing wood-framed shed, horse barn, and chicken coop.

It was listed on the National Register of Historic Places in 2011.

References

Houses on the National Register of Historic Places in New York (state)
Colonial Revival architecture in New York (state)
Houses completed in 1890
Houses in Nassau County, New York
National Register of Historic Places in Nassau County, New York